Lonely Rock is a rock rising  above sea level east of Ula Point, James Ross Island, on the west margin of Erebus and Terror Gulf, Antarctica. It was charted by the Falkland Islands Dependencies Survey, 1945, and named "Lone Rock" by the UK Antarctic Place-Names Committee because of its small size and isolation. The name was modified in 1963 to avoid duplication with Lone Rock off Nelson Island.

References

Rock formations of Graham Land
Landforms of James Ross Island